Clawson, Hose and Harby is a civil parish in Leicestershire, England, forming part of the Melton district. It contains the villages of Harby, Hose and Long Clawson and the parish was created from those former parishes on the 1st of April 1936 (originally named as just "Clawson and Harby"). The population of the civil parish at the 2011 census was 2,577.

References

External links

Parish council

Civil parishes in Leicestershire
Borough of Melton